Kenji Ogiya ( Oogiya Kenji) is a Japanese association football referee who has refereed in the J-League, J. League Division 2 as well as the Polish Ekstraklasa and Polish First League. He is also an international referee, having officiated two international games since 2007.

History

Domestic
Ogiya has been refereeing since 2000, however became a fully professional referee in 2007. Since then he has gone on to officiate nearly 100 J.League games, 9, J. League Division 2 matches, as well as 9 J. League Cup matches. He has also officiated matches in Europe, in the Ekstraklasa and Polish First League.

International

In 2007, Ogiya was awarded his FIFA badge, which made him eligible to officiate international fixtures. To date, he has done so on two occasions. One "friendly" between Poland and Greece, and a 2011 AFC Asian Cup Qualification match between Australia and Indonesia.

International Matches officiated

See also
 List of football referees

References

External links
 World Referee Profile

Japanese football referees
Living people
1971 births
People from Chigasaki, Kanagawa